Bride of the Century, also known as Hundred Year Bride, is a 2014 South Korean television series starring Lee Hong-gi and Yang Jin-sung. It aired on cable channel TV Chosun from February 22 to April 12, 2014 for 20 episodes. The fantasy/romance drama revolves around a family curse that causes the first wife of the first born son to die.

Plot
Taeyang Group is the largest conglomerate in South Korea. The Choi family who runs Taeyang has supposedly been under a curse for a hundred years that the first bride of the eldest son will always die. When the wealthy heiress Jang Yi-kyung (Yang Jin-sung) disappears right before her wedding to chaebol heir Choi Kang-joo (Lee Hong-gi), Na Doo-rim (Yang Jin-sung), a looka impostor, is brought in to take her place. Unlike the cold and calculating Yi-kyung, Doo-rim is sweet and sunny, and Kang-joo genuinely falls in love with her. As the wedding plans progress, Kang-joo and Yi-kyung's mothers both scheme and plot behind the scenes.

Cast
Lee Hong-gi as Choi Kang-joo
Lomon as teen Choi Kang-joo
Jeon Jin-seo as young Choi Kang-joo
A good-looking and educated second-generation chaebol heir. He has a prickly personality, and is self-indulgent and bad at relationships. But he is goodhearted underneath it all, and is harboring pain from his childhood.

Yang Jin-sung as Na Doo-rim / Jang Yi-kyung
Na Doo-rim is a sweet, homely girl who comes from a southern island village. Jang Yi-kyung is a chic, cold and calculating woman who wants to marry into the Choi family. Doo-rim and Yi-kyung are doppelgängers.

Sung Hyuk as Jang Yi-hyun
Yi-kyung's older half-brother. He is the operations manager of Ohsung Construction.

Jang Ah-young as Lee Roo-mi
An upper-class young woman with looks and brains who went to a prestigious university. Roo-mi becomes Doo-rim's rival for Kang-joo's heart.

Nam Jeong-hee as Park Soon-bok
Doo-rim's grandmother.

Park Jin-joo as Oh Jin-joo
Doo-rim's childhood friend.

Choi Il-hwa as Choi Il-do
Kang-joo's father, and CEO of Taeyang Group.

Kim Seo-ra as Kim Myeong-hee 
Kang-joo's mother. The unloved wife of a wealthy man who tries to destroy her son's relationship with a girl from a poor family.

Jung Hae-in as Choi Kang-in
Kang-joo's younger brother, and an idol singer.

Kang Tae-hwan as Secretary Kim
Shin Eun-jung as Ma Jae-ran
Yi-kyung's mother, and CEO of Ohsung Construction.

 Kim Ah-young as Sung Joo-shin
Kim Yoo-jung as Leeann
Im Byung-ki as Butler Jang
Butler of the Choi family.

Kwon Eun-ah as Ahn Dong-daek
Butler Jang's wife.

Production
Filming began in Namhae on December 9, 2013.

After having dinner with the drama crew on December 16, 2013, an accident occurred on an icy street which lead to Lee Hong-gi suffering a dislocated shoulder and facial scratches. He was prescribed six weeks of rest and returned to the set on January 10, 2014.

Reception
It received a good response in Korea for a cable drama, with a peak viewership rating of 1.451%.

According to one of China's biggest internet portal sites QQ, Bride of the Century ranked number one on weekly and monthly charts in both March and April 2014, exceeding 100 million views. It was also ranked as the most searched phrase on China's microblogging service Weibo.

International broadcasting rights have been sold to Japan, U.S., China, Vietnam, Cambodia and other countries. A Chinese remake is expected to air at the end of 2014.

Ratings
In this table,  represent the lowest ratings and  represent the highest ratings.

Original soundtrack

References

External links
Bride of the Century official CSTV website 

2014 South Korean television series debuts
2014 South Korean television series endings
TV Chosun television dramas